Dixie is a 1943 American biographical film of songwriter Daniel Decatur Emmett directed by A. Edward Sutherland and starring Bing Crosby and Dorothy Lamour. Filming in Technicolor, Dixie was only a moderate success and received mixed reviews. Contrary to rumor, it has not been withdrawn from circulation due to racial issues (Crosby appears in blackface during several musical numbers) but is simply one of hundreds of vintage Paramount Pictures from the 1930s and 1940s now owned by Universal and not actively marketed. The movie was broadcast several times in the late 1980s on American Movie Classics channel. The movie produced one of Crosby's most popular songs, "Sunday, Monday, or Always".

Plot

The film opens with Dan Emmett (Crosby) and Jean (Marjorie Reynolds) seated beneath a spreading magnolia tree in the garden of her home while he sings 'Sunday, Monday or Always'. The house is seen on fire and though Dan rushes off to the fire-house for assistance it is burned down. Jean's angry father blames Dan for leaving his pipe in the hall and forbids Dan seeing his daughter again. Dan says that he wants to marry Jean after he has become successful as an actor and composer but Mason is so sure that Dan will fail he says that he will agree to the marriage if Dan returns successful within six months.

Dan leaves for New Orleans and on the river boat sings 'Swing Low, Sweet Chariot' and encounters another entertainer, Mr. Bones (Billy de Wolfe), who cheats him at cards and wins his 500 dollars. It is not until after Bones has left the boat that Dan discovers the cards are faked but he meets him again in New Orleans and demands the return of his money. Bones denies cheating but offers to put Dan in his act. Unable to pay for a meal they have in a restaurant they are assaulted and suffer black eyes. Bones takes Dan to the boarding house owned by Mr. Cook (Raymond Walburn) and his daughter Millie (Dorothy Lamour). Neither Bones nor two other boarders can pay the rent arrears demanded by Millie and she refuses to let Dan stay until Mr. Cook intervenes to tell Bones that the manager of the local Maxwell Theatre has said Bones could try out his act that evening. The other two boarders (Eddie Foy, Jr. and Lynne Overman) sing 'Laughing Tony' to Bones but he refuses to let them join his act. Dan reminds Bones of his promise that he should be in the act but Bones insists that his act is a single until Millie threatens to lock him in his room unless all four appear and she suggests that to cover their battered features they should use black make-up.

On stage the four sing 'Old Dan Tucker' and 'The Last Rose of Summer', introduce minstrel-style patter and Dan sings 'She's from Missouri'. They are successful and Millie becomes attracted to Dan who, however, tells her about Jean. The act continues to do well and is enlarged to a twenty-four artist minstrel show with Mr. Cook joining as the only white-faced member. Although Dan is also attracted to Millie he tells her he will remain loyal to Jean and Millie, in a fit of pique, agrees to marry Bones. The new minstrel show opens and the Company sings 'Minstrel Show' and 'Buffalo Gals', and Dan sings 'A Horse That Knows the Way Back Home'. At a celebration supper Dan and Millie make up their quarrel but the sound of fire bells and a burning theatre, caused by Dan's pipe, puts them all out of a job.

Dan returns to his home-town and finds that Jean has been stricken with paralysis and will never walk again. He insists on going through with the marriage and they travel to New York. In New Orleans Bones again asks Millie to marry him and they learn that the Theatre will be repaired in three weeks’ time. When Dan sings his new song, 'If You Please', to Jean she suggests that he tries to sell his songs but a publisher refuses 'Dixie' when Dan sings it for him. He manages, however, to sell ten' other songs for 100 dollars but refuses to part with 'Dixie' when he is offered only one dollar for it. Mr. Cook arrives and tells Jean of Dan's success in New Orleans and inadvertently reveals the situation between Millie and Dan. Cook urges Dan to return to New Orleans and join a new show of forty artists and when Jean supports this plea Dan agrees. On their arrival in New Orleans Millie is still angry with Dan but realises the true situation when she sees that Jean is an invalid.

The new Minstrel Show is booked into the Opera House for three months but when 'Dixie' is sung by one of the minstrels it is not well received. Jean suggests that it should be played at a quicker tempo but Dan disagrees. Jean, under the impression that Dan is in love with Millie, tells her servant, Lucius (George H. Reed), to place a letter of farewell in Dan's dressing room. The show proceeds and Dan sings 'Sunday, Monday or Always' with the company. While the minstrels sing 'She's From Missouri' Millie, backstage, tells Bones that she will marry him that night and breaks the news to Jean. On stage, Dan and the company sing ‘Dixie' while his pipe, once again left lying around, starts a fire. As the tempo of the song speeds up, the entire audience joins in the rousing chorus and the fire burns Dan's dressing room and Jean's valedictory letter.

Cast

 Bing Crosby as Daniel Decatur Emmett
 Dorothy Lamour as Millie Cook
 Billy De Wolfe as Mr. Bones
 Marjorie Reynolds as Jean Mason
 Lynne Overman as Mr. Whitlock
 Eddie Foy, Jr. as Mr. Felham
 Raymond Walburn as Mr. Cook
 Grant Mitchell as Mr. Mason
 Clara Blandick as Mrs. Mason
 Tom Herbert as Homer
 Olin Howland as Mr. Deveraux (as Olin Howlin)
 Robert Warwick as Mr. LaPlant

 Stanley Andrews as Mr. Masters
 Norma Varden as Mrs. La Plant
 James Burke as Riverboat captain
 George H. Reed as Lucius
 Harry Barris as Drummer
 Jimmy Conlin as Publisher
 George Anderson as Publisher
 Harry C. Bradley as Publisher
 Dell Henderson as Stage manager
 Willie Best as Steward
 Tom Kennedy as Barkeeper
 Carl Switzer as Boy

Reception

The film was placed at No. 15 in the list of top-grossing movies for 1943 in the USA but nevertheless it got a mixed reception. Variety said: "Dixie is a Technicolorful money-getter, ideal for the summer b.o. It has charm, lightness, good new songs by Johnny Burke and Jimmy Van Heusen, the classic oldies by Dan Emmett (‘Dixie’), and some spirituals  such as ‘Swing Low Sweet Chariot.’ And it has Bing Crosby and Dorothy Lamour for the marquee...The new songs are clicko. ‘Sunday, Monday and Always’ and ‘She’s From Missouri’ are Hit Parade material, and the Negro spiritual on the riverboat was effectively introduced by Crosby... Per usual, Crosby is in high with his vocalizing. Whether it’s ‘Dixie’ or the new Tin Pan Alley interpolations, the crooner is never from Dixie when it comes to lyric interpretations. The weaker the film vehicles, the greater is the impact of the Crosby technique. . . .Crosby now is as standard among the male singing toppers as the Four Freedoms, and today he shapes up more and more as the Will Rogers-type of solid American actor-citizen. He enjoys a stature, especially because of his radio programs, enjoyed by no other singing star in show business..."

Bosley Crowther writing in The New York Times was not impressed, saying, inter alia: "Gentlemen (and ladies), be seated—at the Paramount Theatre that is to say—if you are interested in some old-time minstrel capers tossed off in a Technicolor film. For songs and jigs and funny sayings are what Paramount is delivering about 40 per cent of the time in a ruffled and reminiscent picture entitled 'Dixie' which came to that theatre yesterday. Otherwise, the remainder of the picture is mainly and not so spiritedly absorbed in a largely fictitious story of Dan Emmett, the original ‘Virginia Minstrels’ man and the author of the rousing song “Dixie”— a role which the old booper, Bing Crosby, plays... And when Bashful Bing is warbling such sparkless but adequate songs as “Sunday, Monday or Always”, “She’s from Missouri” or “A Horse That Knows the Way Back Home”, it is easy to sit back and listen. There is also a dash of liveliness in the wholly apocryphal climax which pretends to show how “Dixie” was born.       But when the story goes weakly meandering into a pointless, confused romance between Dan and a New Orleans hoyden, played airily by Dorothy Lamour, and then marries him off to an old sweetheart who is crippled (Marjorie Reynolds), it is labored and dull... Mr. De Wolfe, with some coaching, might do in an amateur show, but he is definitely a minus quantity in a spot generally filled by Bob Hope. Indeed, the fact is that none of the picture has the jubilatory spirit and dash that should go with an old-time minstrel story. There’s a great movie in that subject yet. And Paramount had a nerve to make a picture in which Bing — and he alone — has one hit song."

Soundtrack
"Sunday, Monday, or Always" sung by Bing Crosby
"Swing Low, Sweet Chariot" sung by Bing Crosby
"Laughing Tony" (Jimmy Van Heusen / Johnny Burke) sung by Eddie Foy, Jr. and Lynne Overman
"Old Dan Tucker" sung by Bing Crosby, Billy De Wolfe, Eddie Foy, Jr. and Lynne Overman
"The Last Rose of Summer" sung by Bing Crosby, Billy De Wolfe, Eddie Foy, Jr. and Lynne Overman
"She's from Missouri" (Jimmy Van Heusen / Johnny Burke) sung by Bing Crosby and again by chorus
"Minstrel Show" sung by chorus
"Buffalo Gals" sung by chorus
"A Horse That Knows the Way Back Home" (Jimmy Van Heusen / Johnny Burke) sung by Bing Crosby
"If You Please" (Jimmy Van Heusen / Johnny Burke) sung by Bing Crosby
"Dixie" sung by Bing Crosby and again by chorus

Two other songs - "Kinda Peculiar Brown" and "Miss Jemima Walks By" were written for the film by Burke and Van Heusen but were not used.

Bing Crosby recorded two of the songs for Decca Records. “Sunday, Monday, or Always” topped the Billboard charts for seven weeks and "If You Please" charted also with a peak position of #5 in a 12-week stay. Crosby's songs were also included in the Bing's Hollywood series.

References

External links
 

1943 musical films
1943 films
Blackface minstrel shows and films
Films directed by A. Edward Sutherland
Films set in New Orleans
Paramount Pictures films
American musical films
American biographical films
1940s biographical films
1940s English-language films
1940s American films